Guzal Yusupova (born 19 December 1997) is an Uzbekistani tennis player.

Yusupova has a career high WTA singles ranking of 746 achieved on 8 September 2014. She also has a career high WTA doubles ranking of 697 achieved on 18 August 2014.

Yusupova made her WTA main draw debut at the 2013 Tashkent Open in the doubles draw partnering Arina Folts.

External links 
 
 

1997 births
Living people
Uzbekistani female tennis players
People from Qashqadaryo Region
21st-century Uzbekistani women